Microcyclops is a genus of copepods, containing the following species:

Microcyclops afghanicus Lindberg, 1948
Microcyclops alius (Kiefer, 1935)
Microcyclops anceps (Richard, 1897)
Microcyclops anninae (Menzel, 1926)
Microcyclops arenicola Kiefer, 1960
Microcyclops assimilis (Sars G.O., 1927)
Microcyclops atongae Fryer, 1957
Microcyclops attenuatus (Sars G.O., 1909)
Microcyclops bicolor (Sars G.O., 1863)
Microcyclops caudatus (Sars G.O., 1927)
Microcyclops ceibaensis (Marsh, 1919)
Microcyclops crassipes (Sars G.O., 1927)
Microcyclops cunningtoni (Sars G.O., 1909)
Microcyclops davidi (Chappuis, 1922)
Microcyclops diaphanus (Fischer, 1853)
Microcyclops diversus (Kiefer, 1935)
Microcyclops dubitabilis (Kiefer, 1934)
Microcyclops echinatus Fiers, Ghenne & Suárez-Morales, 2000
Microcyclops elegans Dussart & Fernando, 1985
Microcyclops elgonensis (Kiefer, 1932)
Microcyclops elongatus (Lowndes, 1934)
Microcyclops exiguus (Sars G.O., 1909)
Microcyclops falsus (Kiefer, 1929)
Microcyclops finitimus Dussart, 1984

Microcyclops gemellus Gurney, 1928
Microcyclops inarmatus Gutiérrez-Aguirre & Cervantes-Martínez, 2016
Microcyclops inchoatus Shen & Sung, 1965
Microcyclops indolusitanus (Lindberg, 1938)
Microcyclops inopinatus (Sars G.O., 1927)
Microcyclops intermedius Shen & Tai, 1964
Microcyclops javanus Kiefer, 1930
Microcyclops jenkinae (Lowndes, 1933)
Microcyclops karvei Kiefer & Moorthy, 1935
Microcyclops levis (Kiefer, 1952)
Microcyclops linjanticus (Kiefer, 1928)
Microcyclops longiarticulatus Shen & Tai, 1964
Microcyclops longiramus Shen & Sung, 1965
Microcyclops longispinosus Shen & Tai, 1964
Microcyclops margaretae (Lindberg, 1938)
Microcyclops mediasetosus Dussart & Frutos, 1986
Microcyclops medius Dussart & Frutos, 1986
Microcyclops microsetus Yeatman, 1983
Microcyclops moghulensis (Lindberg, 1939)
Microcyclops nyasae (Fryer, 1957)
Microcyclops obscuratus Fryer, 1956
Microcyclops pachycomus (Sars G.O., 1909)
Microcyclops paraplesius (Kiefer, 1929)
Microcyclops pseudoopercularis Lindberg, 1957
Microcyclops pumilis Pennak & Ward, 1985
Microcyclops rechtyae Lindberg, 1960
Microcyclops richardi (Lindberg, 1942)
Microcyclops robustus Shen & Sung, 1965
Microcyclops rubelloides Kiefer, 1952
Microcyclops rubellus (Lilljeborg, 1901)
Microcyclops semilunaris Lindberg, 1952
Microcyclops subaequalis (Kiefer, 1928)
Microcyclops sumatranus (Kiefer, 1933)
Microcyclops symoensi (Kiefer, 1956)
Microcyclops tanganicae Gurney, 1928
Microcyclops tricolor (Lindberg, 1937)
Microcyclops triumvirorum Kiefer, 1935
Microcyclops uenoi Kiefer, 1937
Microcyclops uviranus (Kiefer, 1958)
Microcyclops variabilis Dussart & Sarnita, 1986
Microcyclops varicans (Sars G.O., 1863)

Microcyclops arnaudi (Sars G.O., 1908) → Metacyclops arnaudi (Sars G.O., 1908) → Pescecyclops arnaudi (Sars G.O., 1908)
Microcyclops brevifurca (Lowndes, 1934) → Neutrocyclops brevifurca (Lowndes, 1934)
Microcyclops dengizicus (Lepeshkin, 1900) → Apocyclops dengizicus dengizicus (Lepeshkin, 1900)
Microcyclops exsulis (Gauthier, 1951) → Metacyclops exsulis (Gauthier, 1951)
Microcyclops furcatus (Baird, 1837) → Tisbe furcata (Baird, 1837)
Microcyclops gracilis (Lilljeborg, 1853) → Metacyclops gracilis gracilis (Lilljeborg, 1853)  
Microcyclops kentanensis (Harada, 1931) → Microcyclops linjanticus (Kiefer, 1928)
Microcyclops laticornis (Lowndes, 1934) → Metacyclops laticornis (Lowndes, 1934)
Microcyclops leptopus (Kiefer, 1927) → Metacyclops leptopus (Kiefer, 1927)
Microcyclops mendocinus (Wierzejski, 1892) → Metacyclops mendocinus (Wierzejski, 1892)  
Microcyclops minimus (Kiefer, 1933) → Microcyclops elongatus (Lowndes, 1934)  
Microcyclops minutus Claus, 1863 → Metacyclops minutus (Claus, 1863)
Microcyclops monacanthus (Kiefer, 1928) → Pescecyclops monacanthus (Kiefer, 1928)  
Microcyclops paludicola (Herbst, 1959) → Metacyclops paludicola (Herbst, 1959)
Microcyclops panamensis (Marsh, 1913) → Apocyclops panamensis (Marsh, 1913)
Microcyclops planus (Gurney, 1909) → Metacyclops planus (Gurney, 1909)
Microcyclops postojnae (Brancelj, 1987) → Metacyclops postojnae Brancelj, 1987
Microcyclops pseudoanceps Green, 1962 → Metacyclops pseudoanceps (Green, 1962)
Microcyclops sydneyensis (Schmeil, 1898) → Australocyclops australis (Sars G.O., 1896)
Microcyclops tredecimus (Lowndes, 1934) → Metacyclops tredecimus (Lowndes, 1934)
Megacyclops robustus (G. O. Sars, 1863) → Acanthocyclops robustus (G. O. Sars, 1863)
Megacyclops robustus (G. O. Sars, 1863) → Acanthocyclops robustus (G. O. Sars, 1863)

References

Cyclopoida genera
Cyclopidae